Thomas Wilkes (by 1508 – 1536/37), of Chippenham, Wiltshire, was an English politician.

He was a Member (MP) of the Parliament of England for Chippenham in 1529.

References

1530s deaths
English MPs 1529–1536
Year of birth uncertain